Puna is a village and the capital of the José María Linares Province in the Potosí Department of Bolivia.

References

External links 

Populated places in Potosí Department